Viburnum sargentii is a species of flowering plant in the family Adoxaceae (formerly Caprifoliaceae), native to north eastern Asia. Flat white flower-heads (cymes) resembling those of lacecap hydrangeas are borne in early summer. The outer florets are saucer-shaped and sterile, while the central tubular flowers are fertile. The flowers are followed in autumn by globose red berries.

The specific epithet sargentii commemorates the American botanist Charles Sprague Sargent.

The cultivar 'Onondaga', with red central flowers, has gained the Royal Horticultural Society's Award of Garden Merit.

References

Flora of Asia
sargentii